Skinner Steps Out is a 1929 American comedy film directed by William James Craft and written by Albert DeMond and Matt Taylor. The film stars Glenn Tryon, Merna Kennedy, E. J. Ratcliffe, Burr McIntosh, Lloyd Whitlock and William Welsh. The film was released on November 24, 1929, by Universal Pictures.

Cast        
Glenn Tryon as William Henry Skinner
Merna Kennedy as 'Honey' Skinner
E. J. Ratcliffe as Jackson
Burr McIntosh as J.B. McLaughlin
Lloyd Whitlock as Parking
William Welsh as Crosby
Kathleen Kerrigan as Mrs. Crosby 
Frederick Lee as Gates
Jack Lipson as Neighbor
Edna Marion as Neighbor's Wife

References

External links
 

1929 films
1920s English-language films
Silent American comedy films
1929 comedy films
Universal Pictures films
Films directed by William James Craft
American black-and-white films
1920s American films